Hara Berezaiti, is a legendary mountain around which the stars and planets revolve in the Avestan language.

See also
 *Harahvati Aredvi Sura Anahita, the source of all waters in the world that descends from the mythical Mount Hara.
 Airyanem Vaejah, the first of the lands created by Ahura Mazda.

References

Bibliography
 

Zoroastrianism
Locations in ancient Iranian mythology
Locations in Persian mythology
Iranian words and phrases
Places in Shahnameh
Mythological mountains
Sacred mountains